This is a complete listing of National Basketball Association (NBA) playoff series, grouped by franchise. Series featuring relocated and renamed teams are kept with their ultimate relocation franchises. Bolded years indicate wins. Years in italics indicate series in progress. Tables are sorted first by the number of series, then the number of wins, and then by year of first occurrence.

Atlanta Hawks

Boston Celtics

Brooklyn Nets

Charlotte Hornets

Chicago Bulls

Cleveland Cavaliers

Dallas Mavericks

Denver Nuggets

Detroit Pistons

Golden State Warriors

Houston Rockets

Indiana Pacers

Los Angeles Clippers

Los Angeles Lakers

Memphis Grizzlies

Miami Heat

Milwaukee Bucks

Minnesota Timberwolves

New Orleans Pelicans

New York Knicks

Oklahoma City Thunder

Orlando Magic

Philadelphia 76ers

Phoenix Suns

Portland Trail Blazers

Sacramento Kings

San Antonio Spurs

Toronto Raptors

Utah Jazz

Washington Wizards

Defunct teams

Anderson Packers

Baltimore Bullets (original)

Chicago Stags

Cleveland Rebels

Indianapolis Olympians

Sheboygan Red Skins

St. Louis Bombers

Washington Capitols

Most frequent series

See also
List of NFL playoff games
List of MLB postseason series
List of NHL playoff series
List of WNBA playoff series

References
NBA & ABA Playoffs Series History

Notes

National Basketball Association playoffs